The Australasian Performing Right Association Awards of 1991 (generally known as APRA Awards) are a series of awards held in 1991. The APRA Music Awards were presented by Australasian Performing Right Association (APRA) and the Australasian Mechanical Copyright Owners Society (AMCOS). Two new categories were added, Songwriter of the Year and Ted Albert Memorial Award – the latter honours Ted Albert (1937–1990), an Australian early pioneer independent record producer and founder of Albert Productions.

Awards 

Only winners are noted

See also 

 Music of Australia

References

External links 

 APRA official website

1991 in Australian music
1991 music awards
APRA Awards